Prażmów  is a village in Piaseczno County, Masovian Voivodeship, in east-central Poland. It is the seat of the gmina (administrative district) called Gmina Prażmów.

The village has a population of 403.

References

Villages in Piaseczno County